Metal Bridge may refer to:

Metal Bridge, Cumbria
Metal Bridge, County Durham
 Bridges that are made out of metal